There are many different gods of rain in different religions:

African

African mythology
 Anẓar, god of rain in Berber mythology.
 Achek, wife of the rain god Deng in Dinka mythology
 Mangwe, a water spirit known as "the flooder" in the beliefs of the Ila people of Zambia
 Oya, goddess of violent rainstorms in Yoruba mythology
 Sinvula, god of rain in Bantu mythology
 Nanvula/Nomvula goddess of rain Bantu mythology
 Mbaba Mwana Waresa, goddess of rain in Bantu mythology
 Mpulu Bunzi, god of rain in Kongo mythology. 
 Bunzi, goddess of rain in Woyo mythology (Kongo).
Saa ngmin, God of rain in Dagaaba mythology (Upper West Region of Ghana)

American

Mesoamerica
 Chaac, in Maya religion;
 Tohil, in K'iche' Maya mythology
 Q'uq'umatz, another K'iche' Maya rain god
 Tlaloc, in Aztec and all the other Nahua religions;
 Cocijo, in Zapotec religion;
 Tirípeme Curicaueri, in Purépecha religion;
 Dzahui, in Mixtec religion;
 Mu'ye, in Otomi religion
 Jaguar, in Olmec religion
 Quiateot of the Nicarao people in Nicaragua

North America
 Yuttoere, in De'ne' and Carrier
 Asiaq, goddess among Greenlandic Inuit, and Inuit in Northern Canada
 Shotokunungwa of Hopi people 
 Tó Neinilii of Navajo people
 Coyote (Navajo mythology)

South America
 Eschetewuarha of Chamacoco
 Chibchacum in the religion of the Muisca

Asian

Filipino mythologies

Oden (Bugkalot mythology): deity of the rain, worshiped for its life-giving waters
Apo Tudo (Ilocano mythology): the deity of the rain
Anitun Tauo (Sambal mythology): the goddess of wind and rain who was reduced in rank by Malayari for her conceit
Anitun Tabu (Tagalog mythology): goddess of wind and rain and daughter of Idianale and Dumangan
Bulan-hari (Tagalog mythology): one of the deities sent by Bathala to aid the people of Pinak; can command rain to fall; married to Bitu-in
Santonilyo (Bisaya mythology): a deity who brings rain when its image is immersed at sea
Diwata Kat Sidpan (Tagbanwa mythology): a deity who lives in the western region called Sidpan; controls the rains
Diwata Kat Libatan (Tagbanwa mythology): a deity who lives in the eastern region called Babatan; controls the rain
Diwata na Magbabaya (Bukidnon mythology): simply referred as Magbabaya; the good supreme deity and supreme planner who looks like a man; created the earth and the first eight elements, namely bronze, gold, coins, rock, clouds, rain, iron, and water; using the elements, he also created the sea, sky, moon, and stars; also known as the pure god who wills all things; one of three deities living in the realm called Banting
Tagbanua (Manobo mythology): the god of rain
Pamulak Manobo (Bagobo mythology): supreme deity and creator of the world, including the land, sea, and the first humans; throws water from the sky, causing rain, while his spit are the showers; controls good harvest, rain, wind, life, and death; in some myths, the chief deity is simply referred as the male deity, Diwata

Hindu mythology
 Indra
 Mariamman
 Parjanya
 Shakambhari
 Surupa, sky goddess who brings rain
 Varuna
 Varshini, goddess who brings gentle rain from heaven.

Japanese mythology 
 Kuraokami

Vietnamese mythology 
 Pháp Vũ
 Long Vương
 Thần Mưa

Middle Eastern mythology
 Baal
 Adad

Tibetan mythology
 Kalden
 Lumo, sky goddess of rain and mist

European

Greek mythology
 Hyades, nymphs that bring rain
 Zeus, god of rain, thunder, and lightning

Lithuanian mythology
 Blizgulis, god of snow

Norse Mythology
 Freyr, Norse god of rain, sunshine, summer and fertility

Slavic mythology
 Dodola, goddess of rain
 Dudumitsa, Bulgarian goddess of rain

Oceanian

Hawaiian mythology
 Lono, who was also a fertility god

Australian Aboriginal Dreaming
 Bunbulama, in Yolngu mythology
 Wandjina
 Wollunqua

Notes

Rain deities